The Centre for Cross Border Studies (CCBS) is a think tank based in Ireland.

Activities
The Centre for Cross Border Studies was founded in 1999 with the purpose of undertaking policy research in the field of cross-border cooperation within Ireland and further afield.

The scope of the centre's research encompasses all areas in which practical cross border cooperation between the Republic of Ireland and Northern Ireland may take place; this includes healthcare, education, training, health, ICT, the economy, public administration, planning, the environment, citizens information, impact assessment and other areas.

In addition to publishing and commissioning works of cross-border policy research, The Centre for Cross Border Studies also engages in a range of practical activities with the intention of facilitating cross-border cooperation. It maintains the Border People web portal, which is designed to provide practical information for cross-border workers and students on the island of Ireland as well as those crossing the border to live in the other jurisdiction. The centre also serves as secretariat for two all-island bodies in the field of education, The Standing Conference on Teacher Education, North and South (SCoTENS) and Universities Ireland. In addition, it provides administrative support to its sister organisation The International Centre for Local and Regional Development (ICLRD).

The centre cooperates extensively with the North/South Ministerial Council and other all-island bodies created under the Good Friday Agreement.

References

Think tanks based in Northern Ireland
Think tanks based in the Republic of Ireland
Think tanks established in 1999
1999 establishments in Ireland